I Can't Stop is the 27th studio album by American soul singer Al Green. It was released by Blue Note Records on November 17, 2003, in the United Kingdom and on November 18 in the United States. I Can't Stop was produced by Willie Mitchell. The album was Green's first since 1995, his first for Blue Note, and his first collaboration with Mitchell since 1985's He Is the Light; it was also Green's first entirely secular recording since the 1970s.

The reunion between Green and Mitchell was highly anticipated, and I Can't Stop was a commercial success, peaking at number 53 on the US Billboard 200 and number 9 on the Top R&B/Hip-Hop Albums charts. It was Green's highest placing on both charts since his 1975 album Al Green Is Love. The album was nominated for the 2004 Grammy Award for Best R&B Album, while its title track also received a nod in the Best Traditional R&B Performance category.

Critical reception

I Can't Stop received generally positive reviews from music critics. At Metacritic, it received an average score of 75 out of 100, based on 18 reviews. Mojo opined "(Green) is, if anything, singing better than ever". In The Guardian, Alexis Petridis stated "The songwriting is largely superb, which keeps the album from sounding like a clever pastiche". Robert Christgau, writing in The Village Voice, said that the album is not a sophisticated modernization or comeback to "a form he never lost", but instead shows that Green has "retained plenty of voice and the guile to know what to do with it." In a mixed review, Tom Smucker of The Village Voice felt that Green gets "tied down when production's slathered on a bit too thick". Blender magazine dismissed it as "a weak echo of those gloriously clean and spacious [1970s] LPs".

In a retrospective review for the magazine, Christgau gave the album four stars and called it Green's "finest late pop album". He felt that, although Green "can no longer shade with sprightly delicacy," his singing is louder and strengthened by "two decades in the pulpit at his own Memphis church."

Track listing

All tracks written by Al Green and Willie Mitchell except where noted.

"I Can't Stop" - 3:48
"Play to Win" - 4:38
"Rainin' in My Heart" - 4:45*
"I've Been Waitin' on You" (Green) - 3:43
"You" - 4:29
"Not Tonight" - 4:25
"Million to One" - 4:52
"My Problem Is You" - 6:28
"I'd Still Choose You" - 4:05
"I've Been Thinkin' 'Bout You" (Green) - 4:04
"I'd Write a Letter" (Green) - 3:53
"Too Many" (Green) - 4:01

"Rainin' in My Heart" is a new song written by Green & Mitchell for this album.  Certain song databases have mistakenly classified Green's song as a cover of Slim Harpo's "Rainin' in My Heart", written by James Moore (aka Slim Harpo) and Jerry West (aka J.D. Miller).  The lyrics to the two songs are completely unrelated except for the title.

Personnel and credits

Musicians 

 Al Green – lead vocals, backing vocals (9-12)
 Lester Snell – Fender Rhodes (1), acoustic piano (2, 3, 4, 6-12), organ (5)
 Willie Mitchell – Wurlitzer electric piano (1), arrangements
 Robert Clayborne – organ (1-4, 6-12), acoustic piano (5)
 Mabon "Teenie" Hodges – guitars 
 Charles "Skip" Pitts – guitars (2-12), guitar solo (10)
 Leroy Hodges – bass
 Steve Potts – drums, congas, percussion 
 Charles Chalmers – backing vocals
 Donna Rhodes – backing vocals
 Sandra Rhodes –backing vocals

The Royal Horns
 Arranged by Willie Mitchell and Lester Snell
 Jim Spake – baritone saxophone
 Andrew Love – tenor saxophone 
 Lannie McMillan – tenor saxophone, flute (1), clarinet (12)
 Jack Hale – trombone
 Scott Thompson – trumpet

The New Memphis Strings
 Arranged by Willie Mitchell and Lester Snell
 Orchestrated by Lester Snell
 Jonathan Kirkscey and Peter Spurbeck – cello 
 Anthony Gilbert and Beth Luscombe – viola
 Daniel Gilbert, Joan Gilbert, Gregory Morris and Liza Zurlinden – violin

Production 

 Tom Cartwright – executive producer 
 Michael Cuscuna – executive producer 
 Willie Mitchell – producer, mixing 
 Jason Hohenberg – associate producer 
 Lawrence Mitchell – associate producer, production coordinator 
 Archie Mitchell – associate producer, engineer, mixing 
 Scott Bomar – assistant engineer 
 Bernie Grundman – mastering at Bernie Grundman Mastering (Hollywood, California)
 Zach Hochkeppel – product manager 
 Gordon H. Jee – creative direction
 Burton Yount – art direction, design 
 Clay Patrick McBride – photography 
 Evan Ross – stylist

Charts

References

External links 
 

Al Green albums
Blue Note Records albums
Albums produced by Willie Mitchell (musician)
2003 albums